A formal science is a branch of science studying disciplines concerned with abstract structures described by formal systems, such as logic, mathematics, statistics, theoretical computer science, artificial intelligence, information theory, game theory, systems theory, decision theory, and theoretical linguistics. Whereas the natural sciences and social sciences seek to characterize physical systems and social systems, respectively, using empirical methods, the formal sciences use language tools concerned with characterizing abstract structures described by formal systems. The formal sciences aid the natural and social sciences by providing information about the structures used to describe the physical world, and what inferences may be made about them.

Etymology
The modern usage of the term formal sciences in English-language literature occurs at least as early as 1860, in a posthumous publication of lectures on philosophy by Sir William Hamilton wherein logic and mathematics are listed as formal sciences. Going even further back to 1819, a German-language textbook on logic was published by Wilhelm Esser, elucidating the significance of the designation formal science (Formalwissenschaft) as applied to logic; (an English-language translation of it is provided in a William Hamilton's lecture):

History

Formal sciences began before the formulation of the scientific method, with the most ancient mathematical texts dating back to 1800 BC (Babylonian mathematics), 1600 BC (Egyptian mathematics) and 1000 BC (Indian mathematics). From then on, different cultures such as the Greek, Arab and Persian made major contributions to mathematics, while the Chinese and Japanese, independently of more distant cultures, developed their own mathematical tradition.

Besides mathematics, logic is another example of one of oldest subjects in the field of the formal sciences. The formally sophisticated treatment of modern logic descends from the Greek tradition, being informed from the transmission of Aristotelian logic, which was then further developed by Islamic logicians. The Indian tradition also continued into the early modern period. The native Chinese tradition did not survive beyond antiquity, though Indian logic was later adopted in medieval China.

As a number of other disciplines of formal science rely heavily on mathematics, they did not exist until mathematics had developed to a relatively advanced level. Pierre de Fermat and Blaise Pascal (1654), and Christiaan Huygens (1657) started the earliest study of probability theory. In the early 1800s, Gauss and Laplace developed the mathematical theory of statistics, which also explained the use of statistics in insurance and governmental accounting. Mathematical statistics was recognized as a mathematical discipline in the early 20th century.

In the mid-20th century, mathematics was broadened and enriched by the rise of new mathematical sciences and engineering disciplines such as operations research and systems engineering. These sciences benefited from basic research in electrical engineering and then by the development of electrical computing, which also stimulated information theory, numerical analysis (scientific computing), and theoretical computer science. Theoretical computer science also benefits from the discipline of mathematical logic, which includes the theory of computation.

Branches

Branches of formal science includes:

 logic, 
 mathematics, 
 statistics, 
 data science, 
 information science, 
 systems science, 
 computer science.

Differences from other sciences

As opposed to empirical sciences (natural and social), the formal sciences do not involve empirical procedures. They also do not presuppose knowledge of contingent facts, or describe the real world. In this sense, formal sciences are both logically and methodologically a priori, for their content and validity are independent of any empirical procedures. 

Therefore, strictly speaking, formal science is not an empirical science.  It is a formal logical system with its content targeted at components of experiential reality, such as information and thoughts.  As Francis Bacon pointed out in the 17th century, experimental verification of the propositions must be carried out rigorously and cannot take logic itself as the way to draw conclusions in nature.  Formal science is a method that is helpful to empirical science but cannot replace empirical science.

Although formal sciences are conceptual systems, lacking empirical content, this does not mean that they have no relation to the real world. But this relation is such that their formal statements hold in all possible conceivable worlds – whereas, statements based on empirical theories, such as, say, general relativity or evolutionary biology, do not hold in all possible worlds, and may eventually turn out not to hold in this world as well. That is why formal sciences are applicable in all domains and useful in all empirical sciences.

Because of their non-empirical nature, formal sciences are construed by outlining a set of axioms and definitions from which other statements (theorems) are deduced. For this reason, in Rudolf Carnap's logical-positivist conception of the epistemology of science, theories belonging to formal sciences are understood to contain no synthetic statements, instead containing only analytic statements.

See also

 Philosophy
 Science
 Rationalism
 Abstract structure
 Abstraction in mathematics
 Abstraction in computer science
 Formalism (philosophy of mathematics)
 Formal grammar
 Formal language
 Formal method
 Formal system
 Form and content
 Mathematical model
 Mathematics Subject Classification
 Semiotics
 Theory of forms

References

Further reading
 Mario Bunge (1985). Philosophy of Science and Technology. Springer.
 Mario Bunge (1998). Philosophy of Science. Rev. ed. of: Scientific research. Berlin, New York: Springer-Verlag, 1967.
 C. West Churchman (1940). Elements of Logic and Formal Science, J.B. Lippincott Co., New York.
 James Franklin (1994). The formal sciences discover the philosophers' stone. In: Studies in History and Philosophy of Science. Vol. 25, No. 4, pp. 513–533, 1994
 Stephen Leacock (1906). Elements of Political Science. Houghton, Mifflin Co, 417 pp.
 
 Bernt P. Stigum (1990). Toward a Formal Science of Economics. MIT Press
 Marcus Tomalin (2006), Linguistics and the Formal Sciences. Cambridge University Press
 William L. Twining (1997). Law in Context: Enlarging a Discipline. 365 pp.

External links
 
 Interdisciplinary conferences — Foundations of the Formal Sciences

 
Branches of science